A constitutional referendum was held in the Philippines on 14 November 1967. On 16 March 1967 Congress decided that a Constitutional Convention would be elected in 1971. In preparation for the election, two amendments to the constitution were proposed beforehand. Voters were asked whether they approved of two amendments to the Constitution of the Philippines; one to increase the number of members of the House of Representatives from 120 to 180, and one to allow members of Congress to be elected to Constitutional Conventions without giving up their Congress seats. A petition seeking to stop the referendum was filed before the Supreme Court, but was dismissed five days before the referendum. Both proposals were rejected by voters.

A Constitutional Convention was subsequently elected on 10 November 1970, and began work on a new constitution on 6 January 1971. A draft was published on 29 November 1972 and put to a referendum on 15 January 1973.

Results

On enlarging the House of Representatives

Summary

By province/city

On Congress members becoming Constitutional Convention delegates

Summary

By province/city

See also 
The 1967 Agusan division plebiscite was also held on this day. Unlike the national plebiscite, the division of Agusan province to two provinces, Agusan del Norte and Agusan del Sur, was approved by the voters.

The 1967 Philippine Senate election was also held on this day. While the government lost the plebiscite, the ruling Nacionalista Party won six of the eight seats contested in the election.

References

1967 referendums
1967 in the Philippines
Constitutional referendums in the Philippines
Presidency of Ferdinand Marcos